This is a list of fiction writers from the region of Goa, a former Portuguese colony on the west coast of India, and writers from the Goan diaspora. Goans have written in as many as 13 different languages, according to critic Peter Nazareth.

 Francisco Luis Gomes
 Orlando da Costa
 Leslie de Noronha
 Sonia Faleiro
 Damodar Mauzo
 Pundalik Naik
 Victor Rangel-Ribeiro
 Manohar Shetty
 Lambert Mascarenhas
 Tony Fernandes
 Amita Kanekar
 Peter Nazareth
 Eunice De Souza
 Manuel C. Rodrigues
 Jerry Pinto
 Antonio Gomes
 Ben Antao
 Caridade Damaciano Fernandes

References
, reported in 

Lists of writers
Writers